The HTC ChaCha (also known as HTC Chachacha or HTC Status)  is an Android smartphone that was announced by HTC in February 2011 at the Mobile World Congress, alongside its sister phone, the HTC Salsa.

The ChaCha is primarily designed for text messaging, and also features tight integration with the social network Facebook, which includes a dedicated Facebook button below its keyboard which allows users to quickly share content on the service.

Specification

Processor = 800 MHz processor / MSM7227 (ARMv6)
Memory = 512 MB ROM (onboard) + microSD slot (up to 32 GB)  / 512 MB RAM 
Display = 46 mm (2.6") touch-screen
Camera = 1 x 5 MP color with flash & 1 x VGA
Connectivity = 900/2100 MHz on HSDPA/WCDMA, Quad-band GSM/GPRS/EDGE:850/900/1800/1900 MHz, Bluetooth, Wi-Fi (IEEE 802.11b/g/n), 3.5 mm stereo
Software = Android 2.3.3 (Gingerbread). Android 2.3.5 was subsequently released as a download for this phone in December 2011.

Many custom ROMs now allow unofficial updates to the device, all the way up to Android 4.4.4 Kitkat.

Features

Android OS, v2.3 (Gingerbread)
Accelerometer, proximity, compass
SMS(threaded view), MMS, Email, Push Email, IM
HTML
Radio Stereo FM radio with RDS
 Facebook dedicated key
 SNS integration
 Google Search, Maps, Gmail
 YouTube, Google Talk, Picasa integration
 MP3/AAC+/WAV/WMA player
 MP4/H.264 player
 Organizer
 Document viewer/editor
 Voice memo
 Predictive text input

See also
 HTC First

References

External links

Android (operating system) devices
Chacha
Mobile phones introduced in 2011
Discontinued smartphones
Mobile phones with user-replaceable battery
Mobile phones with an integrated hardware keyboard